Oscar Adem is a former Hong Kong international lawn and indoor bowler.

He won the bronze medal in the men's fours event at the 1972 World Outdoor Bowls Championship in Worthing with Saco Delgado, Abdul Kitchell and Roberto da Silva.

References

Living people
Hong Kong male bowls players
Year of birth missing (living people)